Hair diseases are disorders primarily associated with the follicles of the hair. A few examples are:
 Bubble hair deformity
 Hair casts (shedding of remnants of the inner root sheath)
 Hair loss (alopecia)
 Hirsutism (excessive hair on body parts with usually minimal hair)
 Hypertrichosis (excessive hair growth)
 Ingrown hair
 Monilethrix (beaded hair)
 Premature greying of hair
 Pattern hair loss
 Trichorrhexis invaginata (hair shaft abnormality)
 Trichotillomania (hair-pulling disorder)
Many hair diseases can be associated with distinct underlying disorders.

Piedra are fungal diseases.

Hair disease may refer to excessive shedding or baldness (or both). Balding can be localised or diffuse, scarring or non-scarring. Increased hair can be due to hormonal factors (hirsutism) or non-hormonal (hypertrichosis). Scalp disorders may or may not be associated with hair loss.

See also 
 List of cutaneous conditions

References

External links 

 https://www.nlm.nih.gov/medlineplus/hairdiseasesandhairloss.html

Human hair
Hair diseases